Steven Poulter (born 3 December 1954) is a British former cyclist. He competed in the team time trial event at the 1984 Summer Olympics.

References

External links
 

1954 births
Living people
British male cyclists
Olympic cyclists of Great Britain
Cyclists at the 1984 Summer Olympics
People from Ormskirk